The Tropical Cyclone Wind Signals (TCWS, or simply wind signals or signals; Filipino: Mga Babala ng Bagyo) are tropical cyclone alert levels issued by the Philippine Atmospheric, Geophysical, and Astronomical Services Administration (PAGASA) to areas within the Philippines that may be affected by tropical cyclone winds and their associated hazards.

PAGASA's TCWS system is activated when a tropical cyclone is inside or near the Philippine Area of Responsibility and is forecast to affect the Philippine archipelago. It is a tiered system that has five numbered levels, with higher numbers associated with higher wind speeds and shorter "lead times", which are time periods within which an expected range of wind strength is expected to occur. TCWS signals are issued for specific localities (province or city/municipal level) and are escalated, de-escalated or lifted depending on the expected strength of winds and the movement of the tropical cyclone relative to the affected areas.

Issuance 

Whenever a tropical cyclone forms inside or enters the Philippine Area of Responsibility (PAR), the Philippine Atmospheric, Geophysical, and Astronomical Services Administration (PAGASA) commences the release of Tropical Cyclone Bulletins (TCB) to inform the general public of the cyclone's location, intensity, movement, circulation radius and its forecast track and intensity for at most 72 hours. The TCB also contains a plain-text discussion of the hazards threatening land and coastal waters and the PAGASA's track and intensity outlook for the cyclone.

PAGASA activates the five-tiered Tropical Cyclone Wind Signal (TCWS) system once it is determined that the tropical cyclone inside the PAR is going to directly affect the Philippines and its outermost cyclonic winds is at least 36 hours away from reaching the nearest landmass. All TCWS signal levels in effect in various localities affected or to be affected by tropical cyclone winds are enumerated in each TCB issuance, including the escalation, de-escalation or lifting of such signal levels. Wind signals are hoisted and updated (escalated, de-escalated or lifted) usually in regular time intervals coinciding with the release of a TCB:
6-hourly TCB issuance: when TCWS signals levels have been raised as the tropical cyclone approaches the Philippine landmass (5:00 AM/PM and 11:00 AM/PM PhST).
3-hourly TCB issuance: when (a) the tropical cyclone is about to make landfall within the next 24 hours; (b) during land crossing and directly after land crossing when the tropical cyclone start to move over water away from land; (c) the tropical cyclone remains offshore but is close to the landmass, warranting the activation of TCWS signals (2:00 AM/PM, 5:00 AM/PM, 8:00 AM/PM and 11:00 AM/PM PhST).
TCBs can also be released only twice a day (12-hourly) when the tropical cyclone is too far away that it does not affect the Philippine landmass (whether or not the tropical cyclone is approaching the landmass), in which case no TCWS signals are raised.

Contrary to common misconception, the purpose of the TCWS system is to warn the public of the threat of tropical cyclone winds (and its associated hazards on land and sea); it does not include rainfall (and its associated hazards such as flooding and landslides) induced by tropical cyclones. There are other weather warning systems already in place for rainfall, such as Rainfall Advisories for light to moderate rainfall and the Heavy Rainfall Warning System (HR-WS) for heavy and/or continuous rainfall during rain-intensive weather events including tropical cyclones.

The TCWS system is a tiered system (from TCWS #1 to #5) that allows for the escalation, de-escalation or lifting of wind signals in every TCB issuance depending on the tropical cyclone wind intensity, the extent of tropical cyclone winds (i.e. radius of tropical cyclone wind circulation) and the forecast direction and speed of movement of the tropical cyclone (relative to the Philippine landmass) at the time of TCB issuance. As a tropical cyclone approaches or moves over land, intensifies or becomes wider, a wind signal raised over a particular locality can be escalated to a higher wind signal level; multiple wind signals hoisted over various areas can also be escalated, and the extent or area where there are active wind signals can also be expanded. On the other hand, wind signals are de-escalated to lower wind signal levels, or else lifted or deactivated, and the area where wind signals are active becomes smaller when the tropical cyclone moves away from land, weakens or scales down in its width. The TCWS system also allows for the skipping of wind signal levels, especially when there is a rapid change in the state of the tropical cyclone.

An important feature of the TCWS system is the "lead time", which is the period of time within which an locality should expect the arrival of a range of tropical cyclone wind intensity, i.e. the number of hours from the first time a wind signal is hoisted until the expected range of tropical cyclone wind intensity impacts a particular locality. This makes the TCWS an early warning system, wherein the initial issuance of a particular signal level over a locality does not mean that the inclement weather conditions indicated for the given signal level is already prevailing. The lead time is used to raise awareness of the approximate remaining length of time for the public to prepare against impending tropical cyclone winds. Lead times in the TCWS system are valid only for the first issuance of a particular wind signal; higher wind signal levels correspond to higher wind speeds and shorter lead times.

For example, winds of 39–61 km/h is expected to occur within the next 36 hours when a specific locality is initially put under TCWS #1 due to an approaching tropical cyclone; thus, that locality has at least 36 hours to prepare before such winds arrive or start to occur. When the wind signal in the same locality is escalated to #2, the public has at least 24 hours left to prepare or brace themselves before their locality is struck by winds of 62–88 km/h.

Wind signals under the TCWS system are hoisted primarily at city/municipal or province level. An exception to this is Metro Manila, which is collectively placed under a single wind signal level.

History

Public Storm Warning Signals 
In the 1950s, the PAGASA (then the Philippine Weather Bureau) maintained a tropical cyclone warning system which included ten levels, from Public Storm Warning Signals (PSWS) #1 to #10, issued primarily for seafarers.

A fourth signal level was added in 1997 to accommodate stronger typhoons and, in this amendment, the concept of lead time was first introduced. Each signal level has a corresponding lead time which indicates the period of time within which an locality should expect the arrival of a range of tropical cyclone wind strength, thus informing the public as early as possible of the approximate remaining length of time for preparations against impending tropical cyclone winds. Lead times remain in use in succeeding versions of PAGASA's tropical cyclone signal systems, with higher signal levels corresponding to both stronger wind speeds and shorter lead times.

PAGASA later expanded this to include details on the impacts of such wind intensities (particularly the potential scale of damage to agriculture and infrastructure) and the precautionary measures to be taken. This four-tiered Public Storm Warning Signal system was in place for nearly two decades until amendments were made in 2015, two years after the disaster brought by Typhoon Haiyan.

Tropical Cyclone Warning/Wind Signals 

Typhoon Haiyan, known in the Philippines as Typhoon "Yolanda", caused catastrophic destruction after plowing through the central Philippines in November 2013 with 10-minute maximum sustained winds peaking at 235 km/h as estimated by PAGASA. Discussions on the revision of the PSWS started, as PSWS #4 was deemed inadequate for extreme tropical cyclones.

As a result, PAGASA launched the Tropical Cyclone Warning Signal (TCWS) system in May 2015 to supersede the PSWS. Alongside the TCWS, PAGASA also declared its official tropical cyclone intensity scale which resembles the intensity scale stipulated in the ESCAP/WMO Typhoon Committee's operational manual (implemented by the Japan Meteorological Agency (JMA), which is the WMO Regional Specialized Meteorological Center in charge of the Northwest Pacific basin). In this amendment, PAGASA introduced the "severe tropical storm" category (in between the tropical storm and typhoon categories) and the "super typhoon" category, the latter being defined as an extreme tropical cyclone with 10-minute maximum sustained winds in excess of 220 km/h. A fifth signal level, TCWS #5, was introduced accordingly for super typhoons, with the same 12-hour lead time as TCWS #4.

The Tropical Cyclone Warning Signal was then renamed "Tropical Cyclone Wind Signal" in 2019 to show emphasis that this warning system is based on tropical cyclone wind intensity rather than rains, flash floods and landslides (for which other weather warning systems, particularly the PAGASA Heavy Rainfall Warning System, are already in place).

Current version 
Seven years later, PAGASA announced on March 23, 2022 (in line with the celebration of the 2022 World Meteorological Day) that they have amended both the tropical cyclone intensity scale and the Tropical Cyclone Wind Signals (TCWS) as a result of a "sunset review" of the agency's tropical cyclone warning system. In a press release, PAGASA stated that the intensity scale and TCWS revisions are based on the "adoption of best practices from other TC warning centers and regionally-accepted operational standards, developments in objective guidance for TC wind swaths, operational experiences and challenges encountered by typhoon forecasters, and feedback from end-users and stakeholders."

For the intensity scale, PAGASA lowered the threshold wind speed for classifying super typhoons from 220 km/h to 185 km/h and defined a super typhoon as an extreme tropical cyclone with 10-minute maximum sustained winds reaching 185 km/h or greater (the range of wind speed for typhoon category is consequently adjusted to 118–184 km/h). This is deemed similar to the super typhoon definition used by other meteorological agencies in the Northwest Pacific such as the Hong Kong Observatory (HKO) and the Joint Typhoon Warning Center (JTWC).

For the TCWS, adjustments were made in the wind intensity ranges per wind signal level to account for:
the "indistinguishable" damages sustained in areas under the old TCWS #4 and TCWS #5, as discovered through damage assessment of previous tropical cyclones;
the wide wind intensity range in the old TCWS #2, which was applicable for both tropical storms and severe tropical storms despite significant change in both cyclonic wind strength and impact severity.

PAGASA, thus, amended the TCWS by adjusting the wind intensity ranges per signal level based on the Beaufort wind force scale, which empirically assigns a number from 0 to 12 to measure wind speed. As a result, the wind intensity ranges in the modified TCWS parallels that of the revised tropical cyclone intensity scale, i.e. each signal level in the modified TCWS is associated with each tropical cyclone category (TCWS #1 corresponding to tropical depression, TCWS #2 for tropical storm, and so on). This March 2022 update of the tropical cyclone intensity scale and TCWS is the version that is currently being implemented in the Philippines.

See also 
 Tropical cyclone warnings and watches
 Tropical cyclone scales

External links 
 Philippine Tropical Cyclone Wind Signals (TCWS) – DOST-PAGASA official website (in English)
 Introduction to the March 23, 2022 update of the Philippine Tropical Cyclone Wind Signal (TCWS) System – DOST-PAGASA official YouTube channel (in Filipino)

Notes

References 

Tropical cyclone meteorology
Weather warnings and advisories